The D-400 series engine or the Iron Horse engine was a light-duty two-stroke engine used for powering lawnmowers produced from the 1950s to the late 1970s. D-400 engines were single-cylinder engines designed and manufactured by the Outboard Marine Corporation (OMC; Johnson and Evinrude) for Lawn-Boy and Masport. The D-400 engines displaced 109 cc, generated  of power, and operated in the range of 2400-3300 RPM.

Description
The engines have a distinctive rectangular cowling that has created a nickname of brick-top mowers. Another distinctive feature is the two-finger vertical recoil starter. The kidney-shaped muffler and exhaust unit is mounted beneath the mowers' deck and gives the engine a small, low profile design when compared to the newer and more powerful lawnmower engines. The ignition system employs a magneto, points, and a condenser (capacitor) set-up with an unusual spark-advance system which utilised a weight on the crankshaft to adjust the spark-advance amount depending on engine speed. The sprung governor was also unusual with a throw-yoke which operated under the flywheel and was linked to the throttle. The carburetor was a float design and fed into a pair of reed valves.  

In New Zealand and Australia, Masport also known in New Zealand as "Charlie Gamble" offered the D-400 engine on their Premier, Premier II, Rancher, Rotacut, and Tornado models. In this Oceania market, the D-400 was called the Iron Horse engine.

References

Lawn mowers